The United Restitution Organization (URO) was established in 1948 as a legal aid service to assist victims of Nazi persecution living outside Germany in making restitution and indemnification claims against Germany and Austria. The URO has served over 250,000 clients. It helped Jews, Roma, and other victims of Nazi crimes. At its most expansive, the URO maintained 29 offices in 15 countries around the world. British barrister Norman Bentwich was the chairman of the URO board from 1948 until his death in 1971, and Kurt May, a German-born lawyer who had fled the Nazis in 1934 after he defended a leading Social Democrat wrongly accused of being a Communist, served as its director from the early 1950s until 1990.

References

External links
Guide to the United Restitution Organization New York Office Collection at the Leo Baeck Institute, New York, NY.
The United States Holocaust Memorial Museum also holds several collections related to the URO. They can be found via the USHMM Collections Search.
United Restitution Organization miscellaneous records at the Hoover Institution Archives.

Aftermath of the Holocaust
Organizations established in 1948
Jewish organisations based in the United Kingdom
Restitution
Holocaust charities and reparations